Filipovo may refer to:
 Filipovo, Blagoevgrad Province, a village in Bulgaria
 Filipovo, Haskovo Province, a village in Bulgaria
 Filipovo, former name of Bački Gračac, a village in West Bačka District, Serbia